Vice Admiral Marthinus Bekker  (born 1933) 
was a former South African Navy officer, who served as Chief of the SADF Staff.

Naval career
He joined the Navy in 1957 and served on the  before being transferred to England to join the shipbuilding program for the President class frigates.

He also served as Chief Paymaster, Director of Logistics Systems and Quartermaster General (19761982).

He was later appointed the Minister of Finance for the Ciskei homeland in 1992.

He was appointed Chief of the SADF  Staff, replacing Kat Liebenberg. Before that he served as Chief of Staff Finances.

Awards and decorations 
 
 
 
 
 
 
 

  Grand Star of Military Merit (Chile)

References

1933 births
2022 deaths
Afrikaner people
South African admirals